South Side Historic District may refer to:

South Side Historic District (Kansas City, Missouri), listed on the National Register of Historic Places in Jackson County, Missouri
South Side Historic District (Palestine, Texas), listed on the National Register of Historic Places in Anderson County, Texas
South Side Historic District (Dayton, Washington), listed on the National Register of Historic Places in Columbia County, Washington